The Congressional Hispanic Caucus (CHC) is an organization of 38 Democratic members of the United States Congress of Hispanic and Latino descent. The Caucus focuses on issues affecting Hispanics and Latinos in the United States. The CHC was founded in December 1976 as a legislative service organization of the United States House of Representatives. The CHC is organized as a Congressional Member organization, governed under the Rules of the U.S. House of Representatives.

As of 2021, the CHC is composed entirely of Democrats, although at its founding it was a bipartisan organization. The Republican members left in the late 1990s over policy differences and, in 2003, formed their own group, the Congressional Hispanic Conference. In 2017, the Caucus declined to admit Rep. Carlos Curbelo, who would have been the only Republican member. In 2022, Rep. Mayra Flores, Republican, was denied membership as well.

Purpose 
The Congressional Hispanic Caucus aims to address national and international issues that directly impact the Hispanic community. The function of the CHC is to serve as a forum for the Hispanic Members of Congress to coalesce around a collective legislative agenda. In addition to covering legislative action, the CHC also monitors executive and judicial issues at the federal level.

Senator Bob Menendez, a Cuban American from New Jersey, Senator Catherine Cortez Masto, a Mexican American from Nevada, Senator Ben Ray Luján a Mexican American from New Mexico, and Senator Alex Padilla, a Mexican American from California are currently the only members of the Congressional Hispanic Caucus from the Senate. The remaining 38 members are from the House.

History 

The Congressional Hispanic Caucus (CHC) was organized in 1976 by five Hispanic Congressmen: Herman Badillo (NY), Baltasar Corrada del Río (PR), Kika de la Garza (TX), Henry B. Gonzalez (TX) and Edward Roybal (CA), to serve as a legislative organization through which legislative action, as well as executive and judicial actions, could be monitored to ensure the needs of Hispanics were being met. It was staffed by Raquel Marquez Frankel, who had grown up in Silver City and Albuquerque, New Mexico, and had become, in 1947, the first Latina to attend the University of New Mexico School of Law.  The goal was to work in conjunction with other groups, both inside and outside Congress, to strengthen Federal commitment to Hispanics and heighten the community's awareness of the operation and function of the American political system.

Chairs

Leadership 
 Chair:  Nanette Barragán (CA-44) (D)
 Deputy Chair: Adriano Espaillat (NY-13) (D)
 Vice Chair of Policy: Darren Soto (FL-9) (D)
 Vice Chair of Member Engagement: Tony Cárdenas (CA-29) (D)
 Vice Chair of Communications Teresa Leger Fernández (NM-3) (D)
 Whip: Sylvia Garcia (TX-29) (D)
 Vice Chair of Diversity and Inclusion Gabe Vasquez (NM-2) (D)
 Freshman Representative:  Andrea Salinas (OR-6) (D)

Current membership

United States Senate 
California:

 Alex Padilla (D-CA)

Nevada:

 Catherine Cortez Masto (D-NV)

New Jersey:

 Bob Menendez (D-NJ)

New Mexico:

 Ben Ray Luján (D-NM)

United States House of Representatives 
Arizona:
 Ruben Gallego (AZ-3) (D)
 Raúl Grijalva (AZ-7) (D)

California:
 Jim Costa (CA-21) (D)
 Salud Carbajal (CA-24) (D)
 Raul Ruiz (CA-25) (D)
 Tony Cárdenas (CA-29) (D)
 Grace Napolitano (CA-31) (D)
 Pete Aguilar (CA-33) (D)
 Jimmy Gomez (CA-34) (D)
 Norma Torres (CA-35) (D)
 Linda Sánchez (CA-38) (D)
 Robert Garcia (CA-42) (D)
 Nanette Barragán (CA-44) (D)
 Lou Correa (CA-46) (D)
 Mike Levin (CA-49) (D)
 Juan Vargas (CA-52) (D)

Colorado:
 Yadira Caraveo (CO-8) (D)

Florida:
 Darren Soto (FL-9) (D)
 Maxwell Frost (FL-10) (D)

Illinois:
 Delia Ramirez (IL-3) (D)
 Jesús "Chuy" García (IL-4) (D)

Massachusetts:
 Lori Trahan (MA-3) (D)

New Jersey:
 Rob Menendez (NJ-8) (D)

New Mexico:
 Gabe Vasquez (NM-2) (D)
 Teresa Leger Fernandez (NM-3) (D)

New York:
 Nydia Velázquez (NY-7) (D)
 Adriano Espaillat (NY-13) (D)
 Alexandria Ocasio-Cortez (NY-14) (D)
 Ritchie Torres (NY-15) (D)

Northern Mariana Islands:
 Gregorio Sablan (MP-At large) (D)

Oregon:
 Andrea Salinas (OR-6) (D)

Texas:
 Veronica Escobar (TX-16) (D)
 Joaquin Castro (TX-20) (D)
 Henry Cuellar (TX-28) (D) 
 Sylvia Garcia (TX-29) (D)
 Vicente Gonzalez (TX-34) (D)
 Greg Casar (TX-35) (D)

Washington: 
 Marie Gluesenkamp Perez (WA-3) (D)

Source

Controversies 

On January 31, 2007, a story on the Politico.com website reported that Rep. Joe Baca had called Rep. Loretta Sanchez a "whore" in a conversation with Speaker of the California Assembly Fabian Núñez, prompting Sanchez to resign from the CHC.  Rep. Baca has denied this charge, but two other CHC members, Linda Sánchez (Loretta's sister) and Hilda Solis, expressed support for Loretta Sanchez. In the case of Solis, Baca called her "a kiss-up to Speaker Nancy Pelosi," for which he has apologized to Solis both privately and publicly.

A year prior to the "whore" incident, The CHC's political action committee gave $3,000 to Baca's children's campaigns for state offices in California. Although Baca recused himself from the decision to make the contributions, six members of the caucus criticized the decision, saying that CHC's PAC should support only federal candidates. Consequently, on November 15, 2006, when Joe Baca was elected chair of the CHC, Solis and the Sanchez sisters challenged his election, saying that the voting should have been done by a secret ballot.

On Monday, April 2, 2007, Congresswoman Linda Sánchez closed her offices in honor of César Estrada Chávez Day, a state holiday in California (which fell on a Saturday that year). CHC chair Baca made the following comment on Sánchez's decision to close the office: "I believe the best way to observe César Estrada Chávez Day is not by taking the day off from work or school." On April 12, Linda Sánchez announced that she had suspended her membership in the Congressional Hispanic Caucus, citing "a need for structural reforms to ensure that the caucus is more equitable and inclusive of all its members." She specifically stated that her decision "was not based on personal animus directed at Baca."

On June 30, 2013, Congressman Filemon Vela Jr. resigned from the CHC, citing opposition to the Senate immigration bill which the CHC endorsed, saying: "Opponents of serious immigration reform are extracting a pound of flesh in this process by conditioning a pathway to citizenship on the construction of more ineffective border fence." The Congressional Hispanic Caucus has received support over the years from Mexican billionaire Ricardo Pliego and Azteca America.  Andres Ramirez, a Nevada political consultant, and Kevin de León, the President Pro Tempore of the California State Senate, have worked together to route money from Azteca America to various caucus groups and political campaigns, as Pliego is a known rival to Carlos Slim, whom both de Leon and Ramirez have attacked through the use of phony groups such as "Two Countries One Voice". Ramirez has appeared at functions for the Congressional Hispanic Caucus. The effort to recruit past students and fellows involved in programs of the Congressional Hispanic Caucus has caused some political bloggers to speculate over the effort by California State Senator de Leon and his colleague California State Senator Jim Beall to use their legislative staffs, some of whom have been involved in programs of the Congressional Hispanic Caucus, to take over several local groups of California Democratic Party State Central Committee delegations for the purpose of establishing control for de Leon and his allies.

In November 2017, the caucus refused to admit Republican congressman Carlos Curbelo, who would have been the only Republican in the caucus. In October 2022, it also denied admission to Republican congresswoman Mayra Flores, who was the first Mexican-born congresswoman.

Congressional Hispanic Caucus Institute 

In October 1981, the House Committee on House Administration drafted new regulations stipulating that fundraising activities were to be moved off all government premises. Members of the Congressional Hispanic Caucus decided to maintain a legislative support organization on Capitol Hill, the Congressional Hispanic Caucus, and moved the non-profit, fundraising organization, today known as the Congressional Hispanic Caucus Institute, Inc. to a new residence.

CHC BOLD PAC 
The CHC BOLD PAC (officially the Committee for Hispanic Causes-BOLD PAC and sometimes referred to as simply BOLD PAC) is the Congressional Hispanic Caucus' political arm, endorsing Democratic and especially Hispanic candidates. Ruben Gallego is the current chair of the group. The group raised $8.7 million during the 2018 election cycle.

Gallery

See also 

 List of Hispanic and Latino Americans in the United States Congress
 Congressional caucus
 Congressional Hispanic Conference
 1977 Women's National Conference: Minority-Latino-Women
 Congressional Hispanic Caucus Institute

References

External links 
 
 

Hispanic
Congressional Hispanic Caucus
Politics and race in the United States
1976 establishments in Washington, D.C.
Organizations established in 1976